Nasihat is a 1986 Hindi film directed and produced by Aravind Sen. Rajesh Khanna, Shabana Azmi play the lead roles and supported by Mithun Chakraborty and Deepti Naval. The film was a Silver jubilee hit at the time of its release.

Plot
Indrani, daughter of multimillionaire Seth Ratanlal, falls in love with an ordinary but honest Dinesh and wants to marry him. On finding out about this, dishonest and cunning employee Mohanlal, who has his eye on the business as well as Indrani starts poisoning the mind of Seth Ratanlal. When Seth Ratanlal confronts Indrani, she admits her involvement with Dinesh and that she is pregnant with Dinesh's child.

Mohanlal hires goons to beat up, kidnap and imprison Dinesh. He then tells Seth Ratanlal that Dinesh has absconded to London and that his promise of marrying Indrani was a fake one.

To overcome the predicament and stigma they are in, Seth Ratanlal hands over the running of his office and business to Mohanlal, and temporarily leaves the city with his daughter.

Honest accountant Jagdish, seeing Mohanlal in the chair of owner Seth Ratan Lal, exposes the reality of his fraud. This angers Mohanlal and he gets Jagdish killed in a truck accident. Rajesh, son of Jagdish, vows to avenge his father's death.

After returning, Seth Ratan Lal learns that cunning Mohanlal has taken over all his businesses. Not only is he unable to do anything about it but Indrani is also compelled to marry Mohanlal.

Mohanlal's son Randhir, who is very helpful to the poor and very much aloof from the character of his father, gets union leader Bajrangee released from the jail. Sunita, with a view to take revenge, works as a private secretary to Mohanlal.

Cast
 Rajesh Khanna
 Shabana Azmi
 Mithun Chakraborty
 Deepti Naval
 Amjad Khan
 Kader Khan
 Satyendra Kapoor
 Shriram Lagoo
 Aruna Irani
 Dinesh Hingoo
 Krishnakant
 Shubha Khote
 Dinesh Thakur
 Tanuja

Music
"Tere Mere Pyar Ki Kundali" – Kishore Kumar, Hemalata
"Jhunak Jhunak Jhanjhar Baaje" – Kishore Kumar, Mahendra Kapoor, Alka Yagnik
"Mera Mann Dekhe Sapna" – Sadhana Sargam
"Yeh Hawaayein Sard Sard Hain" – Suresh Wadkar, Asha Bhosle
"Zindagi Hai Kitne Din Ki" – Kishore Kumar, Asha Bhosle
"Tum Bahut Haseen Sahi" – Kishore Kumar, Alka Yagnik

References

External links
 

Films scored by Kalyanji Anandji
1980s Hindi-language films